New York is an American biweekly magazine concerned with life, culture, politics, and style generally, and with a particular emphasis on New York City. Founded by Milton Glaser and Clay Felker in 1968 as a competitor to The New Yorker, it was brasher and less polite, and established itself as a cradle of New Journalism. Over time, it became more national in scope, publishing many noteworthy articles on American culture by writers such as Tom Wolfe, Jimmy Breslin, Nora Ephron, John Heilemann, Frank Rich, and Rebecca Traister.

In its 21st-century incarnation under editor-in-chief Adam Moss, "The nation's best and most-imitated city magazine is often not about the city—at least not in the overcrowded, traffic-clogged, five-boroughs sense", wrote then-Washington Post media critic Howard Kurtz, as the magazine increasingly published political and cultural stories of national significance.

Since its redesign and relaunch in 2004, the magazine has won more National Magazine Awards than any other publication, including the 2013 award for Magazine of the Year. It was one of the first dual-audience "lifestyle magazines", and its format and style have been emulated by some other American regional city publications.

In 2009, its paid and verified circulation was 408,622, with 95.8% of that coming from subscriptions. Its websites—NYmag.com, Vulture, the Cut, and Grub Street—received visits from more than 14 million users per month.

In 2018, New York Media, the parent company of New York magazine, instituted a paywall for all its online sites, followed by layoffs in early 2019. On September 24, 2019, Vox Media announced that it had purchased New York magazine and its parent company, New York Media.

History

1960s
New York began life in 1963 as the Sunday-magazine supplement of the New York Herald Tribune newspaper.  Edited first by Sheldon Zalaznick and then by Clay Felker, the magazine showcased the work of several talented Tribune contributors, including Tom Wolfe, Barbara Goldsmith, and Jimmy Breslin. Soon after the Tribune went out of business in 1966–67, Felker and his partner, Milton Glaser, purchased the rights with money loaned to them by Wall Street bankers led by Armand G. Erpf (who became the magazine's first chairman and who Felker attributed as the financial architect of the magazine) and C. Gerald Goldsmith (Barbara Goldsmith's husband at the time), and reincarnated the magazine as a stand-alone glossy. Joining them was managing editor Jack Nessel, Felker's number-two at the Herald Tribune. New Yorks first issue was dated April 8, 1968. Among the by-lines were many familiar names from the magazine's earlier incarnation, including Breslin, Wolfe (who wrote "You and Your Big Mouth: How the Honks and Wonks Reveal the Phonetic Truth about Status" in the inaugural issue), and George Goodman, a financial writer who wrote as "Adam Smith".

Within a year, Felker had assembled a team of contributors who would come to define the magazine's voice. Breslin became a regular, as did Gloria Steinem, who wrote the city-politics column, and Gail Sheehy. (Sheehy would eventually marry Felker, in 1984.) Harold Clurman was hired as the theater critic. Judith Crist wrote movie reviews. Alan Rich covered the classical-music scene. Barbara Goldsmith was a Founding Editor of New York magazine and the author of the widely imitated series, "The Creative Environment", in which she interviewed such subjects as Marcel Breuer, I. M. Pei, George Balanchine, and Pablo Picasso about their creative process. Gael Greene, writing under the rubric "The Insatiable Critic", reviewed restaurants, cultivating a baroque writing style that leaned heavily on sexual metaphor. Woody Allen contributed a few stories for the magazine in its early years. The magazine's regional focus and innovative illustrations inspired numerous imitators across the country. The office for the magazine was on the top floor of the old Tammany Hall clubhouse at 207 East 32nd Street, which Glaser owned.

1970s
Wolfe, a regular contributor to the magazine, wrote a story in 1970 that captured the spirit of the magazine (if not the age): "Radical Chic: That Party at Lenny's". The article described a benefit party for the Black Panthers, held in Leonard Bernstein's apartment, in a collision of high culture and low that paralleled New York magazine's ethos. In 1972, New York, after a lot of convincing by Gloria Steinem, also launched Ms. magazine, which began as a special issue. New West, a sister magazine on New York model that covered California life, was also published for a few years in the 1970s.

As the 1970s progressed, Felker continued to broaden the magazine's editorial vision beyond Manhattan, covering Richard Nixon and the Watergate scandal closely. In 1976, journalist Nik Cohn contributed a story called "Tribal Rites of the New Saturday Night," about a young man in a working-class Brooklyn neighborhood who, once a week, went to a local disco called Odyssey 2001; the story was a sensation and served as the basis for the film Saturday Night Fever. Twenty years later, Cohn admitted that he'd done no more than drive by Odyssey's door, and that he'd made the rest up. It was a recurring problem of what Wolfe, in 1972, had labeled "The New Journalism."

In 1976, the Australian media baron Rupert Murdoch bought the magazine in a hostile takeover, forcing Felker and Glaser out. A succession of editors followed, including Joe Armstrong and John Berendt.

1980s
In 1980, Murdoch hired Edward Kosner, who had worked at Newsweek. Murdoch also bought Cue, a listings magazine founded by Mort Glankoff that had covered the city since 1932, and folded it into New York, simultaneously creating a useful going-out guide and eliminating a competitor.  Kosner's magazine tended toward a mix of newsmagazine-style stories, trend pieces, and pure "service" features—long articles on shopping and other consumer subjects—as well as close coverage of the glitzy 1980s New York City scene epitomized by financiers Donald Trump and Saul Steinberg. The magazine was profitable for most of the 1980s. The term "the Brat Pack" was coined for a 1985 story in the magazine.

1990s
Murdoch got out of the magazine business in 1991 by selling his holdings to K-III Communications, a partnership controlled by financier Henry Kravis.

In 1993, budget pressure from K-III frustrated Kosner, and he left for Esquire magazine. After several months' search, during which the magazine was run by managing editor Peter Herbst, K-III hired Kurt Andersen, the co-creator of Spy, a humor monthly of the late 1980s and early 1990s. Andersen quickly replaced several staff members, bringing in many emerging and established writers (including Jim Cramer, Walter Kirn, Michael Tomasky, and Jacob Weisberg) and editors (including Michael Hirschorn, Kim France, Dany Levy, and Maer Roshan), and generally making the magazine faster-paced, younger in outlook, and more knowing in tone.

In August 1996, Bill Reilly fired Andersen from his editorship, citing the publication's financial results. According to Andersen, he was fired for refusing to kill a story about a rivalry between investment bankers Felix Rohatyn and Steven Rattner that had upset Henry Kravis, a member of the firm's ownership group. His replacement was Caroline Miller, who came from Seventeen, another K-III title.

2000s
In 2002 and 2003, Michael Wolff, the media critic hired by Miller in 1998, won two National Magazine Awards for his column.  At the end of 2003, New York was sold again, to financier Bruce Wasserstein, for $55 million.

Wasserstein replaced Miller with Adam Moss, known for editing the short-lived New York weekly of the late 1980s 7 Days and The New York Times Magazine.

In late 2004 the magazine was relaunched, most notably with two new sections: "The Strategist", devoted mostly to utility, and "The Culture Pages", covering the city's arts scene. Moss also rehired Kurt Andersen as a columnist.  In early 2006, the company began an aggressive digital expansion with the relaunch of the magazine's website, previously nymetro.com, as nymag.com.

Since 2004, the magazine has won twenty four National Magazine Awards, more than any other magazine over this time period, including Magazine of the Year in 2013, General Excellence in Print four times, and General Excellence Online three times. During this same period it has been a finalist an additional 48 times in categories that included Profile Writing, Reviews and Criticism, Commentary, Public Service, Magazine Section, Leisure Interests, Personal Service, Single-Topic Issue, Photography, Photojournalism, Photo Portfolio, and Design. In 2007, when the magazine for the first time dominated the awards, much of the coverage the next day noted that The New Yorker took home no awards that night, despite receiving nine nominations, and also noted that New York was the first magazine to win for both its print and Internet editions in the same year.

The February 25, 2008 issue featured a series of nude photographs of Lindsay Lohan. Shot by Bert Stern, the series replicated several poses from Stern's widely reproduced final photos of Marilyn Monroe, shot shortly before the actress's fatal drug overdose. That week, the magazine's website received over 60 million hits and with traffic 2000 percent higher than usual.

The magazine is especially known for its food writing (its restaurant critic Adam Platt won a James Beard Award in 2009, and its Underground Gourmet critics Rob Patronite and Robin Raisfeld have won two National Magazine Awards); and for its political coverage, especially John Heilemann's reporting on the 2008 presidential election, which led to his (and Mark Halperin's) best-selling book Game Change, and for coverage of the first two years of the Obama administration; The New Republic praised its "hugely impressive political coverage" during this period.

New York has been widely recognized for its design during this period, with back-to-back design wins at the National Magazine Awards and Magazine of the Year wins from the Society of Publication Designers (SPD) in 2006 and 2007. The 2008 Eliot Spitzer "Brain" cover was named Cover of the Year by the American Society of Magazine Editors (ASME) and Advertising Age and 2009's "Bernie Madoff, Monster" was named Best News & Business Cover by ASME. New York won back-to-back ASME Cover of the Year awards in 2012 and 2013, for "Is She Just Too Old for This?" and "The City and the Storm" respectively.  Design director Chris Dixon and photography director Jody Quon were named "Design Team of the Year" by Adweek in 2008.

In 2009, after Bruce Wasserstein's death, the magazine's ownership passed to his family. Many obituaries noted Wasserstein's revival of the magazine. "While previous owners had required constant features in the magazine about the best place to get a croissant or a beret," wrote David Carr of The New York Times, "it was clear that Wasserstein wanted a publication that was the best place to learn about the complicated apparatus that is modern New York. In enabling as much, Mr. Wasserstein recaptured the original intent of the magazine's founder, Clay Felker."

2010s
On March 1, 2011, it was announced that Frank Rich would leave The New York Times to become an essayist and editor-at-large for New York. Rich began his relationship with the magazine starting in June 2011.

New Yorks "Encyclopedia of 9/11", published on the tenth anniversary of the attacks, was widely praised, with Gizmodo calling it "heartbreaking, locked in the past, and entirely current"; the issue won a National Magazine Award for Single-Topic Issue.

New Yorks offices in lower Manhattan were without electricity in the week following Hurricane Sandy, so the editorial staff published an issue from the midtown office of Wasserstein & Company, the firm that owns New York Media. The issue's cover, shot by photographer Iwan Baan from a helicopter and showing Manhattan half in darkness, almost immediately became an iconic image of the storm, and was named the magazine cover of the year by Time. The photograph on the cover was published as a poster by the Museum of Modern Art, with proceeds benefiting Hurricane Sandy relief efforts.

In 2013, New York magazine took the top honor at the National Magazine Awards again receiving magazine of the year for its print and digital coverage.

In December 2013, the magazine announced plans to move to a biweekly format in March 2014, reducing from 42 annual issues to 29.  Jared Hohlt became top editor of the printed magazine in 2014.

In April 2016, the magazine announced the launch of Select All, a new vertical dedicated to technology and innovation. In 2019, Select All was shuttered and folded into the broadened "Intelligencer" news site.

In December 2018, New Yorks fashion and beauty destination site "the Cut", carried a piece titled "Is Priyanka Chopra and Nick Jonas' Love for Real?", that drew severe backlash from readers for accusing Priyanka Chopra of trapping Nick Jonas into a fraudulent relationship and being a "global scam artist". The publication removed the piece the following morning and issued an apology.

In January 2019, Moss announced that he was retiring from the editorship. David Haskell (editor), one of his chief deputies, succeeded him as editor on April 1, 2019. That same spring, the magazine laid off staff members and temps.

On September 24, 2019, Vox Media announced that it had purchased New York magazine, and its parent company, New York Media.

In May 2020, Vox Media announced it was merging the real estate site Curbed into New York magazine.

Puzzles and competitions

New York magazine was once known for its competitions and unique crossword puzzles.  For the first year of the magazine's existence, the composer and lyricist Stephen Sondheim contributed an extremely complex cryptic crossword to every third issue. In the style of British crosswords (as they are sometimes called), the cryptic crosswords feature clues that include a straight definition and a wordplay definition. Richard Maltby, Jr. took over after him.

In the remaining two weeks out of every three, Sondheim's friend Mary Ann Madden edited an extremely popular witty literary competition calling for readers to send in humorous poetry or other bits of wordplay on a theme that changed with each installment. (A typical entry, in a competition calling for humorous epitaphs, supplied this one for Geronimo: "Requiescat in Apache.") Altogether, Madden ran 973 installments of the competition, retiring in 2000. Hundreds, sometimes thousands, of entries were received each week, and winners included David Mamet, Herb Sargent, and Dan Greenburg. David Halberstam once claimed that he had submitted entries 137 times without winning. Sondheim, Woody Allen, and Nora Ephron were fans.

The Competition's demise, when Madden retired, was greatly lamented among its fans. In August 2000, the magazine published a letter from an Irish contestant, John O'Byrne, who wrote: "How I'll miss the fractured definitions, awful puns, conversation stoppers, one-letter misprints, ludicrous proverbs, openings of bad novels, near misses, et al. (what a nice guy Al is!)." Many entrants have since migrated to The Washington Posts similar "Style Invitational" feature.  Three volumes of Competition winners were published, titled Thank You for the Giant Sea Tortoise, Son of Giant Sea Tortoise, and Maybe He's Dead: And Other Hilarious Results of New York Magazine Competitions.

Beginning in 1980, the magazine ran an American-style crossword. For the first 30 years the puzzle was always by Maura Jacobson, but beginning in the summer of 2010, Cathy Allis Millhauser's byline began appearing in alternate weeks, and the magazine announced her as permanent co-constructor in September 2010. Jacobson retired in April 2011, having created 1,400 puzzles for the magazine, including 30 years when she wrote a puzzle every week without missing an issue. In January 2020, Vulture, New York culture section, began publishing a daily 10x10 crossword.

Digital expansion and destination sites 
In 2006, New Yorks website, NYMag.com, underwent a year-long relaunch, transforming from a magazine companion to an up-to-the-minute news and service destination. In 2008, parent company New York Media purchased the online restaurant and menu resource MenuPages, which serves eight markets across the U.S., as a complement to its own online restaurant listings and to gain a foothold in seven additional cities. In 2011, MenuPages was sold to Seamless. As of July 2010, digital revenue accounted for fully one third of company advertising revenue.

The website includes several branded destination sites: Daily Intelligencer (up-to-date news), the Cut (women's issues), Grub Street (food and restaurants), and Vulture (pop culture). David Carr noted in an August 2010 column, "In a way, New York magazine is fast becoming a digital enterprise with a magazine attached."

The Cut
The Cut launched on the New York website in 2008 to replace previous fashion week blog Show & Talk. The Cut was relaunched in 2012 as a standalone website, shifting in focus from fashion to women's issues more generally. Stella Bugbee became Editor-in-Chief in 2017. On August 21, 2017, New York announced the redesign and re-organization of the Cut website. The new site was designed for an enhanced mobile-first experience and to better reflect the topics covered. In January 2018, the Cut published Moira Donegan's essay revealing her as the creator of the controversial "Shitty Media Men" list, a viral but short-lived anonymous spreadsheet crowdsourcing unconfirmed reports of sexual misconduct by men in journalism. The Cut also includes the pop science section Science of Us, which was previously a standalone site.

Grub Street
Grub Street, covering food and restaurants, was expanded in 2009 to five additional cities served by former nymag.com sister site MenuPages.com. In 2013 it was announced that Grub Street would close its city blogs outside New York, and bring a more national focus to GrubStreet.com.

Vulture

Vulture was launched as a pop culture blog on NYMag.com in 2007. It moved to an independent web address, Vulture.com, in 2012. In 2018, New York Media acquired the comedy news blog Splitsider, folding the operation into the Vulture website.

The Strategist 
In 2016, New York launched the Strategist, an expansion of a column from the print version of New York Magazine that aimed to help readers navigate shopping from the New York perspective. The site joined other product review sites focusing on providing free product reviews to readers, generating affiliate commissions when readers would purchase a product they recommended. The early editorial team included editors David Haskell and Alexis Swerdloff. Popular recurring franchises include celebrity shopping "What I Can't Live Without" series, "Strategist-Approved" gift guides, and beauty reviews by influencer Rio Viera-Newton. The Strategist does not publish branded content, but it earns revenue through affiliate advertising, including the Amazon Associates Program. In 2018, the Strategist experimented with a holiday pop-up retail experience called I Found It at the Strategist. In 2021, the Strategist experimented with on-site shopping, which allowed users to purchase select products without leaving the website.

Books
In the 2000s New York published five books:

 New York Look Book: A Gallery of Street Fashion (Melcher Media, 2007)
 New York Stories: Landmark Writing from Four Decades of New York Magazine (Random House, 2008)
 My First New York: Early Adventures in the Big City (As Remembered by Actors, Artists, Athletes, Chefs, Comedians, Filmmakers, Mayors, Models, Moguls, Porn Stars, Rockers, Writers, and Others) (Ecco / HarperCollins, 2010)
 In Season: More Than 150 Fresh and Simple Recipes from New York Magazine Inspired by Farmers' Market Ingredients (Blue Rider Press, 2012)
 Highbrow, Lowbrow, Brilliant, Despicable: 50 Years of New York (Simon & Schuster, 2017)

Television
Michael Hirschorn's Ish Entertainment developed a TV pilot for Bravo inspired by the magazine's popular weekly Approval Matrix feature, which has appeared in the magazine since November 2004.

New Yorks art critic Jerry Saltz is a judge on Bravo's fine art reality competition series Work of Art: The Next Great Artist. Additionally, Grub Street Senior Editor Alan Sytsma appeared as a guest on judge on three episodes of the third season of Top Chef Masters.

See also

Media of New York City

References

External links
 
 40th Anniversary
 

 
2019 mergers and acquisitions
Biweekly magazines published in the United States
Lifestyle magazines published in the United States
Magazines established in 1968
Magazines published in New York City
Vox Media
1968 establishments in New York City